Muta was a 7th-century Daylamite king, who fought against the Arabs in the battle of Waj Rudh. He was, however, defeated and killed by Nu'aym ibn Muqarrin.

Sources 
 

 

640s deaths
Generals of Yazdegerd III
Military personnel killed in action
Year of birth unknown
Daylamites
7th-century Iranian people